The film directors in this list have made films that were deemed to be notable art films by prominent critics, film festivals, and/or by authors of books on the history of film.

A 

 Eduard Abalov
 Dodo Abashidze
 Vadim Abdrashitov
 Aktan Abdykalykov
 John Abraham
 Lenny Abrahamson
 Maren Ade
 Bas Jan Ader
 Percy Adlon
 Roland af Hällström
 Ashim Ahluwalia
 Eija-Liisa Ahtila
 Chantal Akerman
 Fatih Akin
 Grigori Aleksandrov
 Tomas Alfredson
 Adolfo Alix Jr.
 Khalik Allah
 Woody Allen
 Pedro Almodóvar
 Lisandro Alonso
 Usama Alshaibi
 Robert Altman
 Alejandro Amenábar
 Ana Lily Amirpour
 Laurie Anderson
 Lindsay Anderson
 Paul Thomas Anderson
 Wes Anderson
 Roy Andersson
 Theo Angelopoulos
 Kenneth Anger
 Urszula Antoniak
 Michelangelo Antonioni
 Shinji Aoyama
 Gregg Araki
 G. Aravindan
 Denys Arcand
 Cam Archer
 Jane Arden
 Dario Argento
 Artur Aristakisyan
 Morten Arnfred
 Andrea Arnold
 Martin Arnold
 Darren Aronofsky
 Grigori Aronov
 Fernando Arrabal
 Dinara Asanova
 Hal Ashby
 Don Askarian
 Walter D. Asmus
 Olivier Assayas
 Ari Aster
 Jacques Audiard
 Bille August
 Ilya Averbakh
 Nurith Aviv
 Gabriel Axel
 Richard Ayoade
 Hideaki Anno

B 

 Jamie Babbit
 Héctor Babenco
 Frédéric Back
 Emir Baigazin
 Bruce Baillie
 Sean Baker
 Ralph Bakshi
 Aleksei Balabanov
 Roman Balayan
 Robert Banks
 Scott Barley
 Siddiq Barmak
 Boris Barnet
 Matthew Barney
 Claude Barras
 Jiří Barta
 Šarūnas Bartas
 Svetlana Baskova
 Michal Bat-Adam
 Yevgeni Bauer
 Noah Baumbach
 Pina Bausch
 Henry Bean
 Xavier Beauvois
 Jean Becker
 Jean-Jacques Beineix
 Marco Bellocchio
 Rémy Belvaux
 Carmelo Bene
 James Benning
 Ingmar Bergman
 Wallace Berman
 Bernardo Bertolucci
 Luc Besson
 Frank Beyer
 Bi Gan
 Susanne Bier
 Stig Björkman
 David Blair
 Les Blair
 Bertrand Blier
 John G. Blystone
 Lidia Bobrova
 Hynek Bočan
 Sergei Bodrov
 Gábor Bódy
 Christoffer Boe
 Peter Bogdanovich
 Patrick Bokanowski
 Sergei Bondarchuk
 Bertrand Bonello
 Bong Joon-ho
 André Bonzel
 John Boorman
 Ole Bornedal
 Walerian Borowczyk
 Vladimir Bortko
 Stan Brakhage
 Kenneth Branagh
 Catherine Breillat
 Robert Bresson
 Vinko Brešan
 Matthew Bright
 Tricia Brock
 Lino Brocka
 Peter Brook
 James Broughton
 Clyde Bruckman
 Günter Brus
 Zbyněk Brynych
 Luis Buñuel
 Andrew Bujalski
 Charles Burnett
 Rama Burshtein
 Steve Buscemi
 Jayro Bustamante
 Brian Patrick Butler
 Rolan Bykov
 Yuri Bykov

C 

 Michael Cacoyannis
 Mike Cahill
 Robin Campillo
 Jane Campion
 António Campos
 Laurent Cantet
 Leos Carax
 Henning Carlsen
 Marcel Carné
 Heiner Carow
 Jean-Claude Carrière
 Shane Carruth
 Carlos Casas
 John Cassavetes
 Lucien Castaing-Taylor
 Hélène Cattet and Bruno Forzani
 Liliana Cavani
 Nuri Bilge Ceylan
 Claude Chabrol
 Youssef Chahine
 Jack Chambers
 Charlie Chaplin
 Chen Kaige
 Lisa Cholodenko
 Sylvain Chomet
 Benjamin Christensen
 Grigory Chukhray
 Pavel Chukhray
 Věra Chytilová
 Derek Cianfrance
 Michael Cimino
 Souleymane Cissé
 Jean-Paul Civeyrac
 René Clair
 Larry Clark
 Alan Clarke
 Shirley Clarke
 René Clément
 Edward F. Cline
 Henri-Georges Clouzot
 Jean Cocteau
 Joel and Ethan Coen
 Isabel Coixet
 Bruce Conner
 Tony Conrad
 Francis Ford Coppola
 Sofia Coppola
 Anton Corbijn
 Alain Corneau
 Panos Cosmatos
 Pedro Costa
 Saverio Costanzo
 David Cronenberg
 John Crowley
 Alfonso Cuarón
 Jonás Cuarón
 Michael Cuesta
 Chris Cunningham

D 

 Stephen Daldry
 Mircea Daneliuc
 Georgiy Daneliya
 Serge Daney
 Dardenne brothers
 Hajir Darioush
 Buddhadeb Dasgupta
 Charlotte Dauphin
 Terence Davies
 Assi Dayan
 Rolf de Heer
 Storm de Hirsch
 Brian De Palma
 Vittorio De Sica
 Benoît Delépine
 François Delisle
 André Delvaux
 Zeki Demirkubuz
 Jacques Demy
 Claire Denis
 Maya Deren
 Virginie Despentes
 Arnaud Desplechin
 Michel Deville
 Mohamed Diab
 Diao Yinan
 Lav Diaz
 Tom DiCillo
 Vivienne Dick
 Audrey Diwan
 Xavier Dolan
 Andrew Dominik
 Marian Dora
 Ziad Doueiri
 Bill Douglas
 Alexander Dovzhenko
 Robert Downey Sr.
 Srđan Dragojević
 Andreas Dresen
 Carl Theodor Dreyer
 Anselmo Duarte
 Fabrice Du Welz
 Marcel Duchamp
 Julia Ducournau
 Michaël Dudok de Wit
 Slatan Dudow
 Germaine Dulac
 Piotr Dumała
 Bruno Dumont
 Lena Dunham
 Jay Duplass
 Mark Duplass
 Marguerite Duras
 Guru Dutt
 Ava DuVernay
 Sergey Dvortsevoy
 Ivan Dykhovichny

E 

 Viking Eggeling
 Robert Eggers
 Atom Egoyan
 Fernando Eimbcke
 Sergei Eisenstein
 Ronit Elkabetz
 Shlomi Elkabetz
 Adam Elliot
 Morris Engel
 Ildikó Enyedi
 Jean Epstein
 Reha Erdem
 Víctor Erice
 Benedikt Erlingsson
 Pelin Esmer
 Jean Eustache
 Valie Export
 Richard Eyre

F 

 Zoltán Fábri
 Asghar Farhadi
 Harun Farocki
 Forugh Farrokhzad
 Rainer Werner Fassbinder
 Aleksey Fedorchenko
 Federico Fellini
 Abel Ferrara
 Marco Ferreri
 Louis Feuillade
 Todd Field
 Mike Figgis
 David Fincher
 Nora Fingscheidt
 Oskar Fischinger
 Mika’ela Fisher
 Benedek Fliegauf
 Ari Folman
 Frédéric Fonteyne
 John Ford
 Tom Ford
 Miloš Forman
 Mira Fornay
 Marc Forster
 Bob Fosse
 James Fotopoulos
 Michelangelo Frammartino
 Hollis Frampton
 Robert Frank
 John Frankenheimer
 Ron Fricke
 Gabríela Friðriksdóttir
 Friðrik Þór Friðriksson
 William Friedkin
 Su Friedrich
 Dmitrii Frolov
 Shozin Fukui
 Samuel Fuller

G 

 Savi Gabizon
 Vincent Gallo
 Nisha Ganatra
 Abel Gance
 Anand Gandhi
 Erik Gandini
 Rodrigo García
 Philippe Garrel
 Matteo Garrone
 Tony Gatlif
 Costa-Gavras
 Saša Gedeon
 Jean Genet
 Aleksei Alekseivich German
 Aleksei Yuryevich German
 Valeriya Gai Germanika
 Pietro Germi
 Greta Gerwig
 Ritwik Ghatak
 Bahman Ghobadi
 Goutam Ghose
 Rituparno Ghosh
 Terry Gilliam
 Milton Moses Ginsberg
 François Girard
 Amos Gitai
 Jonathan Glazer
 Crispin Glover
 Jean-Luc Godard
 Lana Gogoberidze
 Dana Goldberg
 Flora Gomes
 Miguel Gomes
 Rita Azevedo Gomes
 Alfonso Gomez-Rejon
 Michel Gondry
 Alejandro González Iñárritu
 Adoor Gopalakrishnan
 Hideo Gosha
 Philippe Grandrieux
 Debra Granik
 James Gray
 William Greaves
 David Gordon Green
 Eugène Green
 Peter Greenaway
 John Greyson
 D. W. Griffith
 Iveta Grófová
 Kristina Grozeva
 Luca Guadagnino
 José Luis Guerín
 Ciro Guerra
 Alain Guiraudie
 David Gurfinkel
 Tomás Gutiérrez Alea
 Amos Guttman
 Alice Guy-Blaché
 Patricio Guzmán

H 

 Alexandr Hackenschmied
 Andrew Haigh
 Szabolcs Hajdu
 Ryusuke Hamaguchi
 Dušan Hanák
 Michael Haneke
 Susumu Hani
 Mia Hansen-Løve
 Hal Hartley
 Wojciech Has
 Jessica Hausner
 Howard Hawks
 Todd Haynes
 Michel Hazanavicius
 Jalmari Helander
 Ladislav Helge
 Piero Heliczer
 Veit Helmer
 John Huston
 Florian Henckel von Donnersmarck
 Don Hertzfeldt
 Juraj Herz
 Werner Herzog
 Tomer Heymann
 John Hillcoat
 Damien Hirst
 Alfred Hitchcock
 Joanna Hogg
 Agnieszka Holland
 Hong Sang-soo
 Christophe Honoré
 Harry Hook
 Mamoru Hosoda
 Hou Hsiao-hsien
 Hu Bo
 Ágnes Hranitzky
 Huang Jianxin
 Ann Hui
 Karim Hussain
 Eva Husson
 Zoltán Huszárik

I 

 Armando Iannucci
 Kon Ichikawa
 Yuri Ilyenko
 Im Kwon-taek
 Im Sang-soo
 Shōhei Imamura
 Hiroshi Inagaki
 Otar Iosseliani
 Gakuryū Ishii
 Katsuhito Ishii
 Teruo Ishii
 Isidore Isou
 Juzo Itami
 James Ivory
 Shunji Iwai

J 

 Ken Jacobs
 Andrzej Jakimowski
 Juraj Jakubisko
 Miklós Jancsó
 Derek Jarman
 Jim Jarmusch
 Vojtěch Jasný
 Anders Thomas Jensen
 Jeffrey Jeturian
 Jean-Pierre Jeunet
 Norman Jewison
 Jia Zhangke
 Jaromil Jireš
 Akio Jissoji
 Alejandro Jodorowsky
 Roland Joffé
 Antti Jokinen
 G. B. Jones
 Terry Jones
 Spike Jonze
 Neil Jordan
 Nana Jorjadze
 Jon Jost
 Radu Jude
 Miranda July
 Pavel Juráček

K 

 Karel Kachyňa
 Ján Kadár
 Alexander Kaidanovsky
 Mikheil Kalatozishvili
 Mikhail Kalatozov
 Tom Kalin
 Vitali Kanevsky
 Semih Kaplanoğlu
 Dagur Kári
 Alex Karpovsky
 Dome Karukoski
 Shaji N. Karun
 Anurag Kashyap
 Mathieu Kassovitz
 Sunao Katabuchi
 Jacques Katmor
 Charlie Kaufman
 Mani Kaul
 Aki Kaurismäki
 Mika Kaurismäki
 Yoshiaki Kawajiri
 Jerzy Kawalerowicz
 Kihachirō Kawamoto
 Naomi Kawase
 Elia Kazan
 Buster Keaton
 Abdellatif Kechiche
 Dorota Kędzierzawska
 Patrick Keiller
 Fred Kelemen
 Jennifer Kent
 Richard Kern
 Amanda Kernell
 Lodge Kerrigan
 Gustave Kervern
 Aharon Keshales
 Rustam Khamdamov
 Mariam Khatchvani
 Nikolay Khomeriki
 Vladimir Khotinenko
 Marlen Khutsiev
 Abbas Kiarostami
 Krzysztof Kieślowski
 Kim Jee-woon
 Kim Ki-duk
 Kim Ki-duk
 Kim Ki-young
 Keisuke Kinoshita
 Teinosuke Kinugasa
 Dimitri Kirsanoff
 Takeshi Kitano
 William Klein
 Elem Klimov
 Elmar Klos
 Alexander Kluge
 Masaki Kobayashi
 Dorota Kobiela
 Eran Kolirin
 Jan Komasa
 Satoshi Kon
 Andrei Konchalovsky
 Jenni Konner
 Tadeusz Konwicki
 Hirokazu Kore-eda
 Harmony Korine
 John Korty
 Marek Koterski
 Alexander Kott
 Petri Kotwica
 Panos H. Koutras
 András Kovács
 Grigori Kozintsev
 Robert Kramer
 Andrei Kravchuk
 Jiří Krejčík
 Kurt Kren
 Grzegorz Królikiewicz
 Václav Krška
 Peter Kubelka
 Stanley Kubrick
 George Kuchar
 Lev Kuleshov
 Lev Kulidzhanov
 Dea Kulumbegashvili
 Kazuo Kuroki
 Akira Kurosawa
 Kiyoshi Kurosawa
 Justin Kurzel
 Emir Kusturica
 Kazimierz Kutz
 Stanley Kwan

L 

 Nadine Labaki
 Bruce LaBruce
 Edvin Laine
 René Laloux
 Albert Lamorisse
 Fritz Lang
 Yorgos Lanthimos
 Claude Lanzmann
 Nadav Lapid
 Pablo Larraín
 Jean-Claude Lauzon
 Standish Lawder
 Patrice Leconte
 Ang Lee
 Lee Chang-dong
 Spike Lee
 Robin Lefevre
 Xavier Legrand
 C. S. Leigh
 Mike Leigh
 Sebastián Lelio
 Claude Lelouch
 Karl Lemieux
 Jan Lenica
 Sergio Leone
 Philippe Lesage
 Jørgen Leth
 Hagai Levi
 Don Levy
 Li Yang
 Jens Lien
 Tobias Lindholm
 Richard Linklater
 Michael Lindsay-Hogg
 Jody Lee Lipes
 Miguel Littín
 Renata Litvinova
 Carlo Lizzani
 Ken Loach
 Barbara Loden
 Ram Loevy
 Kenneth Lonergan
 Konstantin Lopushansky
 Joseph Losey
 Marie Losier
 Emil Loteanu
 Aku Louhimies
 Richard Lowenstein
 David Lowery
 Sergei Loznitsa
 Sidney Lumet
 Pavel Lungin
 Ladj Ly
 Len Lye
 David Lynch

M 

 Gustav Machatý
 Jodie Mack
 Guy Maddin
 Kurt Maetzig
 Maïwenn
 Lech Majewski
 Majid Majidi
 Dušan Makavejev
 Hana Makhmalbaf
 Mohsen Makhmalbaf
 Samira Makhmalbaf
 Terrence Malick
 Louis Malle
 Djibril Diop Mambéty
 David Mamet
 Milcho Manchevski
 Joseph L. Mankiewicz
 Samuel Maoz
 Václav Marhoul
 Chris Marker
 Gregory Markopoulos
 Joshua Marston
 Lucrecia Martel
 Raya Martin
 Vladimir Maslov
 Yasuzo Masumura
 Yoshihiko Matsui
 Toshio Matsumoto
 Elaine May
 John Maybury
 Tom McCarthy
 John Michael McDonagh
 Martin McDonagh
 Ross McElwee
 Norman McLaren
 Conor McPherson
 Steve McQueen
 Julio Medem
 Aleksandr Medvedkin
 Dariush Mehrjui
 Ursula Meier
 Fernando Meirelles
 Jonas Mekas
 Georges Méliès
 Anna Melikian
 Jean-Pierre Melville
 Sam Mendes
 Brillante Mendoza
 Marie Menken
 Jiří Menzel
 E. Elias Merhige
 Natalya Merkulova
 Dmitry Meskhiev
 Márta Mészáros
 Radley Metzger
 Takashi Miike
 Nikita Mikhalkov
 Bennett Miller
 Aleksandr Mindadze
 Vincente Minnelli
 Kenji Misumi
 David Robert Mitchell
 John Cameron Mitchell
 Katie Mitchell
 Alexander Mitta
 Cătălin Mitulescu
 Gorō Miyazaki
 Hayao Miyazaki
 Kenji Mizoguchi
 Moshé Mizrahi
 Jean-Pierre Mocky
 Hans Petter Moland
 Mario Monicelli
 Ivor Montagu
 João César Monteiro
 Lukas Moodysson
 Tomm Moore
 Nanni Moretti
 Jon Moritsugu
 Bill Morrison
 Phil Morrison
 Paul Morrissey
 Lemohang Jeremiah Mosese
 Granaz Moussavi
 Oren Moverman
 Otto Muehl
 Peter Mullan
 Matthias Müller
 Milagros Mumenthaler
 Kornél Mundruczó
 Cristian Mungiu
 Andrzej Munk
 Radu Muntean
 Kira Muratova
 F. W. Murnau

N 

 Na Hong-jin
 Amir Naderi
 Mira Nair
 Nobuo Nakagawa
 Pan Nalin
 Mikio Naruse
 Leonid Nechayev
 Jan Němec
 László Nemes
 Avi Nesher
 Jeff Nichols
 Mike Nichols
 Marysia Nikitiuk
 Elena Nikolaeva
 Nikos Nikolaidis
 Rob Nilsson
 Nonzee Nimibutr
 Mikko Niskanen
 Hermann Nitsch
 Gaspar Noé
 Michael Noer
 Tom Noonan
 Victor Nord
 Yuri Norstein
 Yrjö Norta
 Rashid Nugmanov

O 

 Nobuhiko Obayashi
 Damien O’Donnell
 Mr. Oizo
 Kihachi Okamoto
 Manoel de Oliveira
 Ermanno Olmi
 Gulshat Omarova
 David Ondříček
 Pat O'Neill
 Max Ophüls
 Niels Arden Oplev
 Ruth Orkin
 Mamoru Oshii
 Nagisa Ōshima
 Ruben Östlund
 Leonid Osyka
 Katsuhiro Otomo
 Ulrike Ottinger
 Idrissa Ouédraogo
 Veiko Õunpuu
 Giorgi Ovashvili
 François Ozon
 Ferzan Özpetek
 Yasujirō Ozu

P 

 Roberto Paci Dalò
 Alan J. Pakula
 Euzhan Palcy
 György Pálfi
 Jafar Panahi
 Gleb Panfilov
 Navot Papushado
 Sergei Parajanov
 Park Chan-wook
 Nick Park
 Alan Parker
 Goran Paskaljević
 Pier Paolo Pasolini
 Ivan Passer
 Živojin Pavlović
 Paweł Pawlikowski
 Alexander Payne
 Sam Peckinpah
 Jordan Peele
 Mário Peixoto
 Artavazd Peleshyan
 Arthur Penn
 Sean Penn
 Nicolás Pereda
 Nelson Pereira dos Santos
 Jesse Peretz
 Lester James Peries
 David Perlov
 Elio Petri
 Aleksandr Petrov
 Aleksandar Petrović
 Christian Petzold
 Maurice Pialat
 Franco Piavoli
 Lucian Pintilie
 Dan Pița
 Ihor Podolchak
 Oleg Pogodin
 Roman Polanski
 Gillo Pontecorvo
 Benoît Poelvoorde
 Corneliu Porumboiu
 Sally Potter
 Michael Powell
 Otto Preminger
 Emeric Pressburger
 Aleksandr Proshkin
 Yakov Protazanov
 Sarah Pucill
 Vsevolod Pudovkin
 Cristi Puiu

Q 

 Yair Qedar
 Brothers Quay

R 

 Ilmar Raag
 Vulo Radev
 Michael Radford
 Tomislav Radić
 Alfréd Radok
 Bob Rafelson
 Atiq Rahimi
 Lynne Ramsay
 Gitanjali Rao
 Simone Rapisarda Casanova
 Mark Rappaport
 Pen-ek Ratanaruang
 Man Ray
 Nicholas Ray
 Satyajit Ray
 Carol Reed
 Nicolas Winding Refn
 Godfrey Reggio
 Kelly Reichardt
 António Reis
 Charles Reisner
 Karel Reisz
 Jean Renoir
 Alain Resnais
 Carlos Reygadas
 Ron Rice
 Tony Richardson
 Hans Richter
 Philip Ridley
 Eran Riklis
 Diana Ringo
 Arturo Ripstein
 Dino Risi
 Ben Rivers
 Jacques Rivette
 Alain Robbe-Grillet
 Glauber Rocha
 João Pedro Rodrigues
 Nicolas Roeg
 Aleksandr Rogozhkin
 Éric Rohmer
 Alice Rohrwacher
 Mikhail Romm
 Abram Room
 Jean Rouch
 Jaime Rosales
 Francesco Rosi
 Roberto Rossellini
 Patricia Rozema
 Raúl Ruiz
 Pavel Ruminov
 Ben Russell
 David O. Russell
 Ken Russell
 Walter Ruttmann
 Zbigniew Rybczyński
 Boris Rytsarev

S 

 Mariya Saakyan
 Olli Saarela
 Ira Sachs
 Safdie Brothers
 Leontine Sagan
 Walter Salles
 Ville Salminen
 Helma Sanders-Brahms
 Toivo Särkkä
 Wisit Sasanatieng
 Marjane Satrapi
 Carlos Saura
 Claude Sautet
 John Sayles
 Peter Schamoni
 Angela Schanelec
 Jerry Schatzberg
 Guilhad Emilio Schenker
 Frank Scheffer
 Fred Schepisi
 Lone Scherfig
 Suzanne Schiffman
 Sebastian Schipper
 John Schlesinger
 Volker Schlöndorff
 Jan Schmidt
 Julian Schnabel
 Evald Schorm
 Maria Schrader
 Paul Schrader
 Barbet Schroeder
 Werner Schroeter
 Uli M Schueppel
 Rudolf Schwarzkogler
 Mikhail Schweitzer
 Christian Schwochow
 Céline Sciamma
 Ettore Scola
 Martin Scorsese
 Sam Seder
 Edward Sedgwick
 Ulrich Seidl
 Ousmane Sembène
 Aparna Sen
 Ivan Sen
 Mrinal Sen
 Kirill Serebrennikov
 Albert Serra
 Dror Shaul
 Dawn Shadforth
 Sohrab Shahid-Saless
 Karen Shakhnazarov
 Tali Shalom Ezer
 Viktor Shamirov
 Laizy Shapiro
 Eldar Shengelaia
 Giorgi Shengelaia
 Richard Shepard
 Larisa Shepitko
 Kaneto Shindo
 Makoto Shinkai
 Masahiro Shinoda
 Daryush Shokof
 Cate Shortland
 Gennady Shpalikov
 Esfir Shub
 Vasily Shukshin
 Shyamaprasad
 Vasily Sigarev
 Slobodan Šijan
 Douglas Sirk
 Abderrahmane Sissako
 Ori Sivan
 Vilgot Sjöman
 Victor Sjöström
 Jerzy Skolimowski
 Myroslav Slaboshpytskyi
 Bohdan Sláma
 George Sluizer
 Wojciech Smarzowski
 Jack Smith
 John Smith
 Agnieszka Smoczyńska
 Michael Snow
 Steven Soderbergh
 Alexander Sokurov
 Peter Solan
 Fernando Solanas
 Humberto Solás
 Auraeus Solito
 Peter Sollett
 Todd Solondz
 Sergei Solovyov
 Sion Sono
 Ali Soozandeh
 Paolo Sorrentino
 Jane Spencer
 Jos Stelling
 Oliver Stone
 Straub–Huillet
 Peter Strickland
 Charles Sturridge
 Elia Suleiman
 Martin Šulík
 Nobuhiro Suwa
 Anocha Suwichakornpong
 Seijun Suzuki
 Jan Švankmajer
 Joe Swanberg
 Kris Swanberg
 Eric Swinderman
 Hans-Jürgen Syberberg
 Daniel Syrkin
 István Szabó
 Attila Szász
 János Szász
 Damián Szifron

T 

 Isao Takahata
 Alain Tanner
 Danis Tanović
 Sergey Taramaev
 Andrei Tarkovsky
 Béla Tarr
 Jacques Tati
 Sophie Tatischeff
 Bertrand Tavernier
 Paolo and Vittorio Taviani
 Julie Taymor
 André Téchiné
 Shūji Terayama
 Hiroshi Teshigahara
 Tian Zhuangzhuang
 Johnnie To
 Valery Todorovsky
 Giuseppe Tornatore
 Tran Anh Hung
 Dušan Trančík
 Leonid Trauberg
 Monika Treut
 Joachim Trier
 Coralie Trinh Thi
 Jiří Trnka
 Jan Troell
 François Truffaut
 Tsai Ming-liang
 Athina Rachel Tsangari
 Peter Tscherkassky
 Dito Tsintsadze
 Shinya Tsukamoto
 Teuvo Tulio
 Nikita Tyagunov
 Tom Tykwer

U 

 Alexei Uchitel
 Ekachai Uekrongtham
 Štefan Uher
 Zaza Urushadze

V 

 Karel Vachek
 Petr Václav
 Petar Valchanov
 Jean-Marc Vallée
 Jaco Van Dormael
 Theo van Gogh
 Felix van Groeningen
 Philippe Van Leeuw
 Gus Van Sant
 Alex van Warmerdam
 Agnès Varda
 Valentyn Vasyanovych
 Paul Vecchiali
 Alexander Veledinsky
 Paul Verhoeven
 Mircea Veroiu
 Dziga Vertov
 Lorenzo Vigas
 Jean Vigo
 Drahomíra Vihanová
 Agustí Villaronga
 Denis Villeneuve
 Thomas Vinterberg
 Bill Viola
 Eriprando Visconti
 Luchino Visconti
 František Vláčil
 Josef von Sternberg
 Erich von Stroheim
 Lars von Trier
 Margarethe von Trotta
 Ivan Vyrypaev

W 

 Cynthia Wade
 Taika Waititi
 Andrzej Wajda
 Kōji Wakamatsu
 Wang Bing
 Wayne Wang
 Wang Xiaoshuai
 Andy Warhol
 John Waters
 Peter Watkins
 Lois Weber
 Apichatpong Weerasethakul
 Peter Weibel
 Claudia Weill
 Peter Weir
 Jiří Weiss
 Hugh Welchman
 Orson Welles
 Wim Wenders
 Ben Wheatley
 Robert Wiene
 Eduardo Williams
 Michael Winterbottom
 Wong Kar-wai

Y 

 Yoji Yamada
 Edward Yang
 Yeon Sang-ho
 Yoshishige Yoshida
 Masaaki Yuasa
 Yevgeny Yufit

Z 

 Lordan Zafranović
 Caveh Zahedi
 S. Craig Zahler
 Mark Zakharov
 Krzysztof Zanussi
 Jasmila Žbanić
 Nick Zedd
 Franco Zeffirelli
 Benh Zeitlin
 Petr Zelenka
 Karel Zeman
 Thierry Zéno
 Zhang Yimou
 Chloé Zhao
 Lydia Zimmermann
 Uri Zohar
 Andrzej Żuławski
 Valerio Zurlini
 Alyona Zvantsova
 Andrey Zvyagintsev
 Terry Zwigoff

References

Further reading 
 Dillon, Kimberley Alexandra. The Emerging Identity as Expressed Through Russian Art House Cinema (archived from the original). In: Verges: Germanic and Slavic Studies in Review, Victoria, British Columbia: Department of Germanic and Slavic Studies, Faculty of Humanities, University of Victoria, Volume 2, Number 1, May 2013: Special Symposium Issue – Proceedings from “Walking the Wire:” The Third Germanic and Slavic Studies Graduate Student Symposium and an Undergraduate Student Article, pp. 1–9. Retrieved 23 February 2019.

Lists of film directors